HD 73468 (HR 3417) is a solitary star in the southern circumpolar constellation Volans. It is faintly visible to the naked eye  with an apparent magnitude of 6.10, and is estimated to be 420 light years away based on parallax measurements.

HD 73468 is a star with a classification of G8 III, indicating that it is a giant star. It is currently on the horizontal branch — generating energy via helium fusion in its core. HD 73468 has twice the mass of the Sun but has expanded to 10.24 times the radius of the Sun.

See also
 Lists of stars

References

Volans (constellation)
G-type giants
073468
3417
Volantis, 33
041907
CD -72 00471
High-proper-motion stars